Corey Ballentine (born April 13, 1996) is a Jamaican professional american football cornerback who is a free agent. He played college football at Washburn, and was selected by the New York Giants in the sixth round of the 2019 NFL Draft. He has also played for the New York Jets, Detroit Lions, Atlanta Falcons, and Arizona Cardinals.

College career
After playing at Shawnee Heights High School, Ballentine played college football at Division II Washburn, Ballentine played in 46 games after almost quitting the team in the summer before his freshman year. He primarily played on defense but also served as the team's kick returner and blocked four field goals. Ballentine won the Cliff Harris Award after the conclusion of his senior season, which is given annually to the nation's top small college defensive players. He was also named a 2018 second-team AFCA All-American.

After his senior year, Ballentine was invited to the 2019 Senior Bowl, where he drew attention for his speed. He also participated in the 2019 NFL Scouting Combine.

Professional career

New York Giants
Ballentine was selected by the New York Giants in the sixth round (180th overall) of the 2019 NFL Draft.

On November 10, 2020, Ballentine was waived by the Giants.

New York Jets
Ballentine was claimed off waivers by the New York Jets on November 11, 2020. He was waived/injured on August 23, 2021, and placed on injured reserve. He was released on September 15.

Detroit Lions
On September 16, 2021, Ballentine was claimed off waivers by the Detroit Lions. He was placed on injured reserve on October 15. He was activated on November 18, 2021, then waived the next day and re-signed to the practice squad.

Atlanta Falcons
On January 12, 2022, Ballentine signed a reserve/future contract the Atlanta Falcons. He was waived on August 30.

Arizona Cardinals
On September 7, 2022, the Arizona Cardinals signed Ballentine to their practice squad. He was released off the practice squad thirteen days later.

Green Bay Packers
On September 28, 2022, the Green Bay Packers signed Ballentine to their practice squad. He was promoted to the active roster on November 12.

NFL career statistics

Regular season

Personal life
Ballentine was born in Montego Bay, Jamaica and moved to the United States at six years of age. While at Shawnee Heights and Washburn, Ballentine ran track while playing football, setting Ichabod records for various indoor and outdoor sprinting events.

In the early morning hours of April 28, 2019, the Sunday following the 2019 NFL Draft, Ballentine was injured in a shooting in Topeka while he was attending an off-campus party. Ballentine's college roommate and defensive backfield teammate Dwane Simmons was killed in the shooting.

References

External links
Green Bay Packers bio
Washburn Ichabods bio

1996 births
Living people
American football cornerbacks
Atlanta Falcons players
Detroit Lions players
Jamaican emigrants to the United States
Jamaican players of American football
New York Giants players
Arizona Cardinals players
Green Bay Packers players
People from Montego Bay
Players of American football from Kansas
Sportspeople from Topeka, Kansas
Washburn Ichabods football players
Shooting survivors